The Babylon Branch is a rail service operated by the Long Island Rail Road in the U.S. state of New York. The term refers to the trains serving Montauk Branch stations from Valley Stream east to Babylon; in other words, the Babylon Branch is a rail service rather than an actual track. The electrification of the Montauk Branch ends east of the Babylon station, so the Babylon Branch is mostly served by electric trains.

Some Montauk Branch trains operate nonstop through Babylon Branch stations until reaching Babylon, though others use the Central Branch between Belmont Junction west of Babylon station and a junction at Beth Interlocking on the Main Line southeast of Bethpage Station, running to New York City via the Main Line. On weekends, Babylon Branch trains typically stop at Forest Hills and Kew Gardens in the eastbound direction as opposed to other Main Line trains that serve other branches.

The Babylon Branch portion of the Montauk Branch is completely grade separated with bridges over all intersecting roadways. New York State Route 231 and the Meadowbrook Parkway are the two exceptions to this; the tracks pass under these roadways.

History

Early history 

The South Side Railroad of Long Island in the 1860s built what was to become the Montauk Branch of the Long Island Rail Road. The Babylon Branch as a separate operational entity began as the electrification of the Montauk Branch between Valley Stream and Babylon on May 20, 1925. Eventually, this would also include the former "Springfield Branch" which the Montauk Branch was relocated to northeast of Springfield Junction.

Grade-separation project 
The tracks were elevated from ground-level between 1950 and 1980. Elevation of the line sparked grass-roots efforts to preserve the previous versions of Wantagh and Lindenhurst Stations, the former of which resulted in the creation of the Wantagh Railroad Museum. The last station to be elevated on the branch was Massapequa Park on December 13, 1980.

On December 30, 1968, the first revenue train of M1 cars departed Babylon for Penn Station. In anticipation, all stations that were still at grade level had their platforms converted from low-level to high-level (an increase of 4 feet) from late-1967 to late-1968 in time for when the fleet went into service. Stations that were still at-grade at the time were Lindenhurst, Copiague, Amityville, Massapequa Park, Bellmore, and Merrick. The former three's grade separation projects had just gotten underway a few months prior, while Massapequa Park was still at-grade and the latter two were being prepared for their projects. All stations that had been elevated were equipped with single high-level island platforms, except for Babylon, which had two platforms. The call for high-level platforms was due to the M1 lacking steps that the fleet they were replacing had, and to make travel times quicker by several minutes.

Work on grade separation began in 1970. The stretch of track between Amityville and Lindenhurst was grade-separated, with new high-level platforms on elevated viaducts, on August 7, 1973. At the same time, the stretch of track through Bellmore and Merrick was grade-separated, which was completed on June 28, 1975.

In 1977, work began on the $29.5 million project to elevated the line through Massapequa Park to eliminate grade crossings. As part of the project, the platform at Massapequa was lengthened to accommodate twelve-car trains, meaning all stations on the branch could accommodate at least ten cars. The platform extension was completed in January 1980. This grade-separation project was completed on December 13, 1980.

In October 1986, work began to extend the platform at Baldwin from being ten cars long to being twelve-cars long. As part of the project, a temporary wooden platform at the station's eastern end would be demolished and replaced by a -long concrete slab. Work was expected to be completed in three months. Platform extensions had already been completed at Rockville Centre, Freeport, Merrick, and Wantagh.

Station renovations 
Since the 1990s, many station houses along the branch have been rebuilt, including the entire platforms at Seaford from July 2008 to July 2009, Massapequa from late 2013 to mid-2015, and Wantagh from late 2016 to late 2018. Additionally, from July 2007 to April 10, 2011, the signals, switches, and gantries were replaced between Wantagh and Amityville, with color light signals replacing the old position-light signals installed during the elevation of that section in 1973.

A pocket track was built east of the Massapequa station between the two tracks. This was to be completed by Spring 2016, but was pushed back to April 2019.

Plans for the future include the modernization of Babylon Interlocking, viaduct track replacement at certain stations, replacement of platforms, escalators, and elevators at Babylon. In November 2022, the MTA announced that intends to install elevators at Massapequa Park, Amityville, Copiague, and Lindenhurst stations and thus make them ADA accessible; these are the only four stations on the branch that are not currently ADA accessible.

Stations

References

External links

world.nycsubway.org: Babylon Branch
Babylon Branch (The LIRR Today)

Long Island Rail Road branches
Transportation in Nassau County, New York
Transportation in Suffolk County, New York
Railway lines opened in 1867